The Mesquite High School Gymnasium, at 144 E. North 1st St. in Mesquite, Nevada, was built in 1939.  It was listed on the National Register of Historic Places in 1992.

It was designed by Salt Lake City architect Miles M. Miller in Italian Renaissance Revival style.  It was funded by the Public Works Administration and was built by contractor Salznar-Thompson.

References 

Gyms in the United States
National Register of Historic Places in Clark County, Nevada
Buildings and structures in Mesquite, Nevada
School buildings on the National Register of Historic Places in Nevada
Italian Renaissance Revival architecture in the United States
Buildings and structures completed in 1939
Sports venues on the National Register of Historic Places
High schools in Clark County, Nevada